Donald Amechi Igwebuike (born December 27, 1960) is a Nigerian-born former American football kicker who played professionally for the National Football League's Tampa Bay Buccaneers from 1985 to 1989. He is the fourth place all-time scorer for the Buccaneers with 416 overall points. Often kicking barefoot, Igwebuike also played for the 1990 Minnesota Vikings and in the Canadian Football League with the Baltimore Stallions in 1994 and the Memphis Mad Dogs in 1995. Earlier, he attended Clemson University and was the kicker for the Tigers' 1981 national championship team.and soccer team. 

In November 1990, Igwebuike was indicted by a federal grand jury on felony charges that he assisted a $1 million heroin smuggling plot. He was acquitted in April 1991.

Personal life
Igwebuike is a first cousin, once removed to Seattle Seahawks running back Godwin Igwebuike.

References

External links
Profile
Statistics

1960 births
Living people
Sportspeople from Enugu
American football placekickers
Canadian football placekickers
Baltimore Stallions players
Clemson Tigers football players
Memphis Mad Dogs players
Minnesota Vikings players
Nigerian emigrants to the United States
Tampa Bay Buccaneers players
Tampa Bay Storm players
Players of American football from Enugu State
Nigerian players of American football